Brendon Cannon (born 30 August 1961) is an Australian boxer. He competed in the men's middleweight event at the 1984 Summer Olympics. At the 1984 Summer Olympics, he lost to Rick Duff of Canada.

References

External links
 

1961 births
Living people
Australian male boxers
Olympic boxers of Australia
Boxers at the 1984 Summer Olympics
Place of birth missing (living people)
Middleweight boxers